Cathedral were a doom metal band from Coventry, England. The group gained attention upon release of its debut album, Forest of Equilibrium (1991), which is considered a classic of the genre. However, the band's sound evolved quickly and began to adopt characteristics of 1970s metal, hard rock and progressive rock. After releasing ten full-length albums and touring extensively for over two decades, Cathedral broke up after the release of The Last Spire in 2013.

History

Early history (1989–1991)
In 1989, Lee Dorrian left Napalm Death because he was reportedly tiring of the punk scene and did not like the death metal direction which Napalm Death was taking. Cathedral was formed after Lee Dorrian and Mark Griffiths (a Carcass roadie) met and discussed their love for bands like Black Sabbath, Candlemass, Pentagram, Trouble, and Witchfinder General.  The band was founded in 1989 by Dorrian, Griffiths and Garry Jennings (formerly of thrash metal band Acid Reign). Dorrian was the only founding member to remain with Cathedral for its duration, although Jennings' departure ultimately proved to be temporary. Cathedral released The Forest of Equilibrium through Earache. According to Dorrian, only Winter or Autopsy were doing something similar, sound-wise, at the time.

The Columbia years (1992–1994)
After the release of the Soul Sacrifice EP, Cathedral signed with Columbia Records. That enabled the successful two-month Campaign for Musical Destruction Tour in the United States.
Cathedral's experience on Columbia was described by Dorrian as "surreal". As Dorrian explained,

Cathedral's major label debut, The Ethereal Mirror, was noted by Jason Birchmeier of Allmusic for its experimentation, upbeat tempos, and groove-laden guitar riffs. After releasing The Ethereal Mirror in 1993, Cathedral was dropped by Columbia the following year.

Back to Earache (1995–2001)

The band resumed its relationship with Earache Records, which lasted until 2001.  During this time, Cathedral released four full-length albums that continued to explore faster rhythms and 1970s-hard rock-influenced guitar riffs before returning to a relatively slow cadence for Endtyme in 2001.

Switching labels (2002–2010)

Cathedral signed with Spitfire Records and released The VIIth Coming. After releasing a single album on Spitfire, Cathedral signed to Nuclear Blast for their final three albums.  These albums included the "inspired" and "quirky" but "uneven" The Garden of Unearthly Delights, the double-disc The Guessing Game, which was touted as the "most psychedelic, progressive material in the band's entire catalog" and the "true doom" of the band's farewell album, The Last Spire.

The Last Spire and split (2011–present)
While Cathedral had contemplated disbanding in the past, most recently after the release of The Garden of Unearthly Delights in 2006, on 6 February 2011, Cathedral announced that they would disband after the release of The Last Spire in April 2013. Dorrian explained that "It's simply time for us to bow out. Twenty one years is a very long time and it's almost a miracle that we managed to come this far!" Cathedral played their last show in Perth, Western Australia during the Soundwave 2012 tour.

Shortly before the release of The Last Spire, Dorrian told Noisecreep that there will never be a Cathedral reunion, and called that idea "absolutely stupid." Guitarist Gaz Jennings added that chances of a Cathedral reunion are "very, very slim", and that he "just can't see" it happening in the future. He also stated that Dorrian has "moved on" and does not want to be involved in a reunion. Three out of four of the final members of Cathedral reformed the band Septic Tank after Cathedral's break up. 

When asked in July 2020 by Decibel magazine about the possibility of a Cathedral reunion, Dorrian said: "To just reform and cash in on the lucrative offers we've been getting ever since we broke up would feel a bit like we're just doing it for the cash, which is never what it was about in the first place. Never say never, I guess, but it's very doubtful. We ended it for a reason."

Musical style
Cathedral's releases have been marked by sharp shifts in style.  While Forest of Equilibrium was firmly entrenched in a slow, heavy doom sound, elements of 1970s metal and groovier riffs entered its sound beginning with the Soul Sacrifice EP. By the time that The Ethereal Mirror was released, the band had incorporated references to 1970s music, such as the disco influences heard on "Midnight Mountain".

As Dorrian explains, the band's original sound was a product of the immediate musical environment combined with the band members' influences:

Beginning with the Soul Sacrifice EP, the band began to incorporate a diverse array of 1970s influences into its sound. With 2001's Endtyme, Cathedral re-introduced the slower, doomy elements that had not been as prevalent on its previous four albums.

The Guessing Game represented another development in the band's sound, with Cathedral's progressive and psychedelic influences coming to the forefront.  For Dorrian, the album's direction was a result of the fact that:

Remarking on Cathedral's penchant for evolving its sound, Dorrian said:

Members

Final line-up 
 Lee Dorrian – vocals (1989–2013)
 Garry Jennings – guitars (1989–2013), bass (1993–1994), keyboards (1994–1996)
 Brian Dixon – drums (1994–2013)
 Scott Carlson – bass (2011–2013)

Former members
 Andy Baker – drums (1989)
 Adam Lehan – guitars (1989–1994)
 Mark Griffiths – bass (1989–1993), guitars (1989)
 Ben Mochrie – drums (1989–1991)
 Mike Smail – drums (1991–1992)
 Mark Ramsey Wharton – drums (1992–1994), keyboards (1992)
 Leo Smee – bass (1994–2011)

Live musicians
 Victor Griffin – guitars (1994)
 Joe Hasselvander – drums (1994)
 Barry Stern – drums (1994–1995)
 Dave Hornyak – drums (1995)
 Max Edwards – bass (2003–2004)

Timeline

Discography

 Forest of Equilibrium (1991)
 The Ethereal Mirror (1993)
 The Carnival Bizarre (1995)
 Supernatural Birth Machine (1996)
 Caravan Beyond Redemption (1998)
 Endtyme (2001)
 The VIIth Coming (2002)
 The Garden of Unearthly Delights (2005)
 The Guessing Game (2010)
 The Last Spire (2013)

References

Bibliography
 "Doom Top Tens: The Depths of Doom" (2006). Terrorizer, 144, 52–53.

External links

 Cathedral discography on Last.fm

English doom metal musical groups
English heavy metal musical groups
Musical groups from Coventry
Musical groups established in 1989
Musical groups disestablished in 2013
Earache Records artists
Musical quartets
Nuclear Blast artists